The Lotus case concerns a criminal trial which was the result of the 2 August 1926 collision between the S.S. Lotus, a French steamer, and the S.S. Bozkourt, a Turkish steamer, in a region just north of Mytilene (Greece). As a result of the accident, eight Turkish nationals aboard the Bozkourt drowned when the vessel was torn apart by the Lotus.

Background
On 7 September 1927, the case was presented before the Permanent Court of International Justice, the judicial branch of the League of Nations, the predecessor of the United Nations.

The issue at stake was Turkey's jurisdiction to try Monsieur Demons, the French lieutenant on watch duty at the time of the collision. Since the collision occurred on the high seas, France claimed that the state whose flag the vessel flew had exclusive jurisdiction over the matter. France proffered case law, through which it attempted to show at least state practice in support of its position. However, those cases involved ships that both flew the flag of the same state. The Court, therefore, by a bare majority, rejected France's position, stating that there was no rule to that effect in international law.

Lotus principle
The Lotus principle or Lotus approach, usually considered a foundation of international law, says that sovereign states may act in any way they wish so long as they do not contravene an explicit prohibition. The application of this principle – an outgrowth of the Lotus case – to future incidents raising the issue of jurisdiction over people on the high seas was changed by article 11 of the 1958 High Seas Convention. The convention, held in Geneva, laid emphasis on the fact that only the flag state or the state of which the alleged offender was a national had jurisdiction over sailors regarding incidents occurring on the high seas.

This "flag state principle" has since been also been implemented in United Nations Convention on the Law Of the Sea (UNCLOS), e.g. in article 92 and, in regards to enforcement of environmental legislation, article 217(1). 

The principle has also been used in arguments against the reasons of the United States of America for opposing the existence of the International Criminal Court (ICC).

Mahmut Esat Bozkurt

In the court the Turkish side was represented by Mahmut Esat Bozkurt, the Minister of Justice. In 1934, when Turkey adopted the formal surname system, Mahmut Esat chose the surname Bozkurt as a reminiscence of the case.

See also
Everything which is not forbidden is allowed
United Nations Convention on the Law of the Sea

References

Resources
The Case of The S.S. Lotus Full Text of the Judgment.
The Case of The S.S. Lotus Combined French and English version
The Case of The S.S. Lotus Spanish version / Versi´çon en español

1927 in case law
1927 in international relations
International law
Lotus Case
France–Turkey relations
Mytilene